The Kingston upon Hull trolleybus system once served the city of Kingston upon Hull (usually referred to as Hull), in the East Riding of Yorkshire, England.

By the standards of the various now-defunct trolleybus systems in the United Kingdom, the Hull system was a medium-sized one, with a total of 7 routes, and a maximum fleet of 100 trolleybuses.

Hull's distinctively liveried trolleybuses played a role in the Philip Larkin poem, Here, which is set in Hull.  None have survived.

See also

Transport in Kingston upon Hull
List of trolleybus systems in the United Kingdom

References

Further reading

External links

National Trolleybus Archive
British Trolleybus Society, based in Reading
National Trolleybus Association, based in London

 

Transport in Kingston upon Hull
Kingston Upon Hull
Kingston Upon Hull